Willoch is a surname. Notable people with the surname include:

 Kåre Willoch (born 1928), Norwegian politician
 Odd Isaachsen Willoch (1885–1940), Norwegian naval officer
 Herman Willoch, Norwegian painter
 Erik Willoch, Norwegian jurist
 Sigurd Willoch, Norwegian art historian